Ah Dede Vah Dede  is a Turkish folkloric tune  hasaposerviko. The meter is .Hasaposerviko, the last two terms in reference to Serbian and other Balkan influences on this version of the dance. Its music was composed Turkish Tuğrul Dağcı.Turkish lyrics written by Oktay Yurdatapan. There are similar folkloric tunes known as Arabaci.

Original form

The original form of the Hasaposerviko  was popular in İzmir.

See also
Hava Nagila
Hopak
Sirmpa
Külhanlı
Arabaci
Mangiko
Olmaz Olsun (song)

References

Turkish songs
Year of song missing